Maria Rene Ann Lourdes Garcia Matibag is a Filipina politician and Member of the Philippine House of Representatives from Laguna's 1st District from 30 June 2022; she served on the Laguna Provincial Board from 30 June 2019 until 30 June 2022.

References 

Living people
21st-century Filipino politicians
Women members of the House of Representatives of the Philippines
Year of birth missing (living people)